Bunky may refer to:

People 
Bunky Echo-Hawk (born 1975), Native American artist and poet
Vernice Bunky Green (born 1935), American jazz musician and educator
Bunky Harkleroad, basketball coach
George Bunky Henry (1944–2018), American golfer in the 1960s and '70s
Carl Bunky Loucks, American politician
Norris "Bunky" Mack, a member of the band The Swallows
Rudolph G. Bunky Matthews (1915–1976), American football and basketball coach
Bill Bunky Miller, reality show contestant
Darius "Bunky" Rose, a member of the American hard rock band The Fifth
Bill Sheppard (music producer) (1922–1997), music promoter, music producer, and executive
Andrea "Bunky" Skinner, member of folk rock duo Bunky and Jake
Veston Bunky Stewart (1931–2007), American baseball pitcher

Other uses 
Bunky (band), a band on the Asthmatic Kitty label
Bunky (comic strip), a comic created by Billy DeBeck
 Bunky board, support for a bunk bed

See also
Bunkie (disambiguation)
Bunki, an era of Japanese history spanning from 1501 to 1504
Bunkyō, one of the 23 special wards of Tokyo, Japan

Lists of people by nickname